"Running on Empty" is a song by American singer-songwriter Jackson Browne. It is the title track of his 1977 live album of the same name, recorded at a concert at Merriweather Post Pavilion in Columbia, Maryland, on August 27, 1977. A number 11 hit on the US Billboard Hot 100 when it was released as a single, it spent seventeen weeks on the chart after debuting on February 11, 1978 at position 72. Rolling Stone ranked it at number 496 on its list of "The 500 Greatest Songs of All Time" in 2010 and number 492 in 2004 and it is one of Browne's signature songs. "Running on Empty" was most popular in Canada, where it spent two weeks at number four.

History
Browne wrote the song while driving to the studio each day to make The Pretender, according to Rolling Stone magazine: "I was always driving around with no gas in the car," Browne is quoted. "I just never bothered to fill up the tank because — how far was it anyway? Just a few blocks."

The song starts off with an immediate, propulsive backbeat, with the melody carried by piano and throughout laced by David Lindley's distinctive lap steel guitar work.  Browne receives vocal back up from Rosemary Butler and Doug Haywood.

Rolling Stone writer Paul Nelson saw "Running on Empty" as embodying a "tenacious, win/lose duality" and being "what daydreamers have nightmares about".  Billboard described the song as "fiery rock 'n' roll that continues in intensity throughout" while containing "serious lyric content" from the singer/songwriter's "identifiable gritty vocal". Record World predicted that it "should be [Browne's] biggest pop radio hit in several years," saying that "the tempo is quick, the vocal energetic."

With its number 11 peak on the Hot 100 in Spring 1978, "Running on Empty" was Browne's third-biggest hit single in his career (trailing only "Doctor My Eyes" and "Somebody's Baby"), and subsequently became his most-played song on classic rock radio formats.

Later uses
The song was featured prominently in the 1994 film Forrest Gump as the main theme for a running montage in which the title character treks across the United States on foot.

In August 2008, Browne sued presumptive Republican presidential nominee John McCain, the Ohio Republican Party, and the Republican National Committee for unauthorized use of "Running on Empty" in a television commercial mocking presumptive Democratic nominee Barack Obama's energy policy.  The case was settled out of court for an undisclosed sum in July 2009, with the McCain campaign, the Ohio Republican Party, and the Republican National Committee issuing a joint apology for using the song.  Browne said, "I'm really happy that we got this statement from them. It's great to have it affirmed that these [copyright and usage] laws stand. I've had an idea of how my songs are protected and how money is collected and how making a living as a musician works for my whole career, and it's great to have it affirmed and to know that we're absolutely right in standing up to them."

Various concert clips of "Running On Empty" from during and after 1977 are known to exist, though none from the concert where the original audio is taken, and no formal music video was released. In June 2019, Browne's official YouTube channel posted a montage of Joel Bernstein photos from the 1977 Jackson Browne Running On Empty Tour in a video created by Andrew Thomas.

Personnel
Jackson Browne – vocals, guitar
Danny Kortchmar – guitar
David Lindley – lap steel guitar
Craig Doerge – piano
Leland Sklar – bass guitar
Russ Kunkel – drums
Rosemary Butler, Doug Haywood – background vocals

Production 
Greg Ladanyi – mix engineer

Chart performance

Weekly charts

Year-end charts

Notes

1977 songs
1978 singles
Asylum Records singles
Jackson Browne songs
Live singles
Songs about cars
Songs written by Jackson Browne
Song recordings produced by Jackson Browne